Eduardo Costa (born 23 September 1977) is an Argentine judoka who competed in the 2000 Summer Olympics, in the 2004 Summer Olympics, and in the 2008 Summer Olympics.

References

External links
 

1977 births
Living people
Argentine male judoka
Olympic judoka of Argentina
Judoka at the 2000 Summer Olympics
Judoka at the 2004 Summer Olympics
Judoka at the 2008 Summer Olympics
Pan American Games medalists in judo
Pan American Games silver medalists for Argentina
Judoka at the 1999 Pan American Games
Medalists at the 1999 Pan American Games
20th-century Argentine people
21st-century Argentine people